Francis Blondet (born 2 February 1945) is a French diplomat. He served as ambassador of France to Burkina Faso from 2003 to 2006 and later served as ambassador to Angola.

References

1945 births
Ambassadors of France to Angola
Living people